Mugarty (Muğartı) is a rural locality (a selo) in Derbentsky District, Republic of Dagestan, Russia. The population was 1,614 as of 2010. There are 14 streets.

Geography 
Mugarty is located 32 km southwest of Derbent (the district's administrative centre) by road. Mitagi and Rukel are the nearest rural localities.

Nationalities 
Azerbaijanis live there.

References 

Rural localities in Derbentsky District